Hannes Aigner (born 16 March 1981) is an Austrian former professional footballer who played as a striker.

Career
Aigner made his Austrian Bundesliga debut with FC Wacker Tirol in the 2002–03 season and moved to Austria Wien after four seasons in Innsbruck. In summer 2008, he left Austria Wien for newly formed Austrian second-division side FC Magna Wiener Neustadt – who were acquiring the playing licence of SC Schwanenstadt for the 2008–09 campaign – where he was joined by Austria Wien teammates Sanel Kuljić, Yüksel Sariyar and Saso Fornezzi.

Aigner moved onto LASK in the First League for the 2011–12 season before transferring to SC Rheindorf Altach for the start of the 2012–13 season.

Honours
Austria Wien
Austrian Cup: 2007

FC Magna Wiener Neustadt
Austrian First League: 2008–09

FC Wacker Tirol
Austrian First League: 2003–04

External links
 Player profile – FC Magna Wiener Neustadt
 Guardian Football

References

1981 births
Living people
People from Schwaz
Footballers from Tyrol (state)
Austrian footballers
Association football forwards
Austrian Football Bundesliga players
2. Liga (Austria) players
FC Wacker Innsbruck (2002) players
FK Austria Wien players
LASK players
SC Wiener Neustadt players
SC Rheindorf Altach players